The 1946 Green Bay Packers season was their 28th season overall and their 26th season in the National Football League. The team finished with a 6–5 record under coach Curly Lambeau, earning them a third-place finish in the Western Conference.

Offseason

NFL draft

 Yellow indicates a future Pro Bowl selection

Regular season

Schedule

Standings

Roster

Awards, records and honors

References

 Sportsencyclopedia.com

Green Bay Packers seasons
Green Bay Packers
Green Bay Packers